AMWE (pronounced "Amuui") (born May 6, 1984) is an indie New Wave and electronica artist from Nagoya, Japan. Getting her start in Jazz cover bands and 80s-styled music groups, She eventually debuted in October 2009, under Pure Groove Records. AMWE produces, writes, and provides the vocals to all of her music.

Born in 1984, AMWE got her big break when she won the Japanese leg of the Diesel U music competition in 2008. Experimenting with making music on her computer, she was inspired at a gig with Swedish artist Juvelen and began focusing on a solo career. Getting more exposed, the French electronic music label Kitsuné invited her to remix a song and gave her the chance to appear on one of their compilation albums, Kitsuné Maison 8, with her song “Friction Between the Lovers”.

AMWE has drawn comparisons to artists such as pop artist Robyn, French duo Daft Punk, and Japanese electro singer Immi.

She was selected as one of the 10 best new artists in 2010, in "iTunes Japan Sound of 2010", for which iTunes selects the most prospective young artists, based on the voting by music-related people. Her second album contains a total of 12 songs and a DVD, including a cover of "Girls and Boys", a hit song by Blur in 1994; a cover of "Groove Is in the Heart", a hit by Deee-Lite; a cover of "Only Shallow", by My Bloody Valentine; "Moon Light", a standard number at AMWE's live performances, a girl's anthem called "Girl's Night Out", and more.

In 2011, she released in duet a Japanese cover version of the song Un ange à ma table from French pop rock and new wave band Indochine. The recording revenues were sent to the Japanese Red Cross as a relief to the earthquake and tsunami disaster.

Discography

Studio albums
 I am AMWE (November 30, 2009)
 Girls (September 29, 2010)

Mini-albums
 Bangin' The Drum EP (September 15, 2009)

References

External links
  

1984 births
Living people
Japanese electronic musicians
Japanese dance musicians
People from Nagoya
Musicians from Aichi Prefecture
Japanese women in electronic music
21st-century Japanese women singers
21st-century Japanese singers